Georgi Todorov (born 4 December 1952) is a retired Bulgarian weightlifter who won the silver medal in the featherweight class at the 1976 Summer Olympics. Furthermore, he's been two times World weightlifting champion and three times European weightlifting champion. Honorary citizen of the city of Varna.

Weightlifting achievements 

Georgi Todorov had the following podium finishes at major championships:

• 2nd in the 1976 Olympics Featherweight class (280.0 kg);

• 2nd in the 1973 World Championships Bantamweight class (255.0 kg);

• 1st in the 1974 World Championships Featherweight class (280.0 kg);

• 1st in the 1975 World Championships Featherweight class (285.0 kg);

• 2nd in the 1976 World Championships Featherweight class (280.0 kg);

• 2nd in the 1977 World Championships Bantamweight class (247.5 kg);

• 2nd in the 1979 World Championships Featherweight class (275.0 kg);

• 2nd in the 1972 European Championships Bantamweight class (355.0 kg);

• 2nd in the 1973 European Championships Bantamweight class (252.5 kg);

• 1st in the 1974 European Championships Featherweight class (272.5 kg);

• 1st in the 1975 European Championships Featherweight class (285.0 kg);

• 3rd in the 1976 European Championships Featherweight class (277.5 kg);

• 1st in the 1977 European Championships Bantamweight class (247.5 kg);

• 2nd in the 1979 European Championships Featherweight class (272.5 kg).

World records 

He set six featherweight world records from 1974-76 – two in the snatch, one in the clean & jerk, and three in the total.

References

External links 
 
 
 http://www.chidlovski.net/liftup/l_athleteResult.asp?a_id=272#wc

1952 births
Living people
Bulgarian male weightlifters
Olympic weightlifters of Bulgaria
Olympic silver medalists for Bulgaria
Olympic medalists in weightlifting
Medalists at the 1976 Summer Olympics
Weightlifters at the 1972 Summer Olympics
Weightlifters at the 1976 Summer Olympics
European Weightlifting Championships medalists
World Weightlifting Championships medalists
20th-century Bulgarian people
21st-century Bulgarian people